Jannat Jalil is a TV and radio newsreader.

She gained an honours degree in English and European literature from Warwick University.

She was previously a presenter and reporter for BBC News. She presented on BBC World News at weekends. Jalil was also a newsreader and reporter for BBC News 24 and BBC Breakfast before joining Sky News in 2011. She currently presents on Euronews.

References

External links
 
 TVNewsroom.co.uk
 Jannat Jalil Twitter Account

Living people
BBC newsreaders and journalists
Alumni of the University of Warwick
BBC World News
Year of birth missing (living people)